Calliotropis abyssicola is a species of sea snail, a marine gastropod mollusk in the family Eucyclidae.

Description
It can have a shell size of up to 10mm.

Distribution
It can be found in the Mid-Pacific Seamounts between the Marshall Islands and Hawaii.

References

 Rehder H. A. & Ladd H. S. (1973) Deep and shallow-water mollusks from the Central Pacific. Science Reports of the Tohoku University, Sendai, ser. 2 (Geology) Special vol. 6 (Hatai Memorial Volume): 37–49, pl. 3. page(s): 44
 Vilvens C. (2007) New records and new species of Calliotropis from Indo-Pacific. Novapex 8 (Hors Série 5): 1–72.

External links

abyssicola
Gastropods described in 1973